Patricia Egan Jones is an American Democratic Party politician who represented the 5th Legislative District in the New Jersey General Assembly since she was sworn into office on November 9, 2015, until her retirement in January 2020.

Early life 
A resident of Barrington, Jones received an associate degree from Mount Aloysius College in fine arts and a bachelor's degree from Rutgers University–Camden with a major in political science. Before pursuing elected office, Jones had worked as chief of staff for Joseph J. Roberts, Speaker of the General Assembly, and later as legislator director for Walter Rand. Jones served on the Barrington Borough Council from 1996 to 1998. She was elected to countywide positions in Camden County, serving on the Board of Chosen Freeholders from 1998 to 2000 and as the County Surrogate from 2001 to 2015. As a freeholder, Jones was an advocate for bringing the USS New Jersey to the Camden Waterfront on the Delaware River.

New Jersey Assembly 
Angel Fuentes and Holly Cass had won the Democratic Party primary for the two Assembly seats to be on the ballot for the November 2015 general election. After Fuentes resigned from office, Jones was selected to run for the new term of office and to fill the balance of the term of the vacant seat. Arthur Barclay was chosen to fill the other ballot spot after primary victor Holly Cass volunteered to step aside. After the ballot results were certified, Jones was sworn into office on November 9 by Assembly Speaker Vincent Prieto. In the Assembly, Jones is co-sponsor of a bill introduced in June 2016 that would designate the USS New Jersey as the official state ship. On March 14, 2019 Jones announces she would not run for re-election in 2019.

Committees 
Transportation and Independent Authorities
Budget
Higher Education

Electoral history

Assembly

References

External links
Assemblywoman Jones' legislative web page, New Jersey Legislature
New Jersey Legislature financial disclosure forms
2015

Living people
County commissioners in New Jersey
New Jersey city council members
Mount Aloysius College alumni
New Jersey County surrogates
Democratic Party members of the New Jersey General Assembly
People from Barrington, New Jersey
Politicians from Camden County, New Jersey
Rutgers University–Camden alumni
Women state legislators in New Jersey
21st-century American politicians
21st-century American women politicians
20th-century American politicians
20th-century American women politicians
Year of birth missing (living people)
Women city councillors in New Jersey